Palinure-class brigs of the French navy include:

See also

Ship classes
Brigs of the French Navy